Miche may refer to:

Miche (bag), a handbag company
Miche (bread), a type of Pain de campagne
Miche (company), an Italian bicycle company
Miche (cycling team)
Miche (horse), an Argentinian Thoroughbred racehorse
Miche, a system of self-reconfiguring modular robot
Miche, a pin used in the sport of León bowls, a variation of Basque bowls
 Miche (film), a 1932 French film

See also
Grand Duke Michael Mikhailovich of Russia, known within his family as "Miche-Miche"